"A Nation Once Again" is a song written in the early to mid-1840s by Thomas Osborne Davis (1814–1845). Davis was a founder of Young Ireland, an Irish movement whose aim was for Ireland to gain independence from Britain.

Davis believed that songs could have a strong emotional impact on people. He wrote that "a song is worth a thousand harangues". He felt that music could have a particularly strong influence on Irish people at that time. He wrote: "Music is the first faculty of the Irish... we will endeavour to teach the people to sing the songs of their country that they may keep alive in their minds the love of the fatherland."

"A Nation Once Again" was first published in The Nation on 13 July 1844 and quickly became a rallying call for the growing Irish nationalist movement at that time.

The song is a prime example of the "Irish rebel music" subgenre. The song's narrator dreams of a time when Ireland will be, as the title suggests, a free land, with "our fetters rent in twain".  The lyrics exhort Irish people to stand up and fight for their land: "And righteous men must make our land a nation once again".

It has been recorded by many Irish singers and groups, notably John McCormack, The Clancy Brothers, The Dubliners, The Wolfe Tones (a group with Republican leanings) in 1972, the Poxy Boggards, and The Irish Tenors (John McDermott, Ronan Tynan, Anthony Kearns) and Sean Conway for a 2007 single. In the Beatles' movie A Hard Day's Night, Paul McCartney's Irish grandfather begins singing the song at the Metropolitan Police after they arrest him for peddling autographed pictures of the band members.

In 2002, after an orchestrated e-mail campaign, the Wolfe Tones' 1972 rendition of "A Nation Once Again" was voted the world's most popular song according to a BBC World Service global poll of listeners, ahead of "Vande Mataram", the national song of India.

Davis copied the melody for the chorus from the second movement of Mozart's clarinet concerto.
Famously, Winston Churchill used this phrase in an attempt to get Ireland to join forces with the British during World War II. Churchill said ‘now or never. A nation once again’ proposing that if Ireland joined forces with Britain then a united Ireland would be the reward. The Irish Prime Minister Éamon de Valera did not respond to Winston Churchill's telegram.

Lyrics

The lyrics use a simple ABABCDCD rhyme scheme, with verses of eight lines, and alternating lines of iambic tetrameter and iambic trimeter. Davis describes how he learned of ancient fighters for freedom as a boy — the three hundred Spartans who fought at the Battle of Thermopylae.  The "three men" may refer to Horatius Cocles and his two companions who defended the Sublician Bridge, a legend recounted in Macaulay's poem "Horatius, published as part of the Lays of Ancient Rome, in 1842, or alternatively to the three assassins of Julius Caesar (Brutus, Gaius Cassius Longinus and Decimus Junius Brutus Albinus) who aimed to preserve the Roman Republic from tyranny.  He relates this to his own hopes that Ireland may yet be freed, and be no longer a British "province" but a nation of its own. The use of the term "once again" refers to Gaelic Ireland, the pre-modern island of Gaelic culture largely independent of foreign control. Davis mentions his belief that only moral, religious men could set Ireland free, and his own aims to make himself worthy of such a task.

References

External links

 A Nation Once Again on IrishSongs.com

1844 songs
Songs about Ireland
The Dubliners songs